The Portage Street Historic District is located in Lodi, Wisconsin. Among the buildings within it is the Frank T. and Polly Lewis House.

References

Historic districts on the National Register of Historic Places in Wisconsin
National Register of Historic Places in Columbia County, Wisconsin